The St. Paul's German Presbyterian Church and Cemetery is a historic place in Elmont, New York.  It was nominated for listing on the National Register of Historic Places in 2008.

It is one of few buildings that remains from the area's longstanding German community.

See also
 National Register of Historic Places listings in Hempstead (town), New York
 Jamaica First German Presbyterian Church

References

External links
 
 

Churches on the National Register of Historic Places in New York (state)
Gothic Revival church buildings in New York (state)
Churches completed in 1904
Cemeteries on the National Register of Historic Places in New York (state)
Churches in Nassau County, New York
Protestant Reformed cemeteries
Cemeteries in Nassau County, New York
German-American culture in New York (state)
National Register of Historic Places in Nassau County, New York
1904 establishments in New York (state)